Gutian 1st Road station, is a station of Line 1 of Wuhan Metro. It entered revenue service on July 29, 2010. It is located in Qiaokou District. It is sponsored by Wulan Group.

Station layout

Transfers
Bus transfers to Route 546, 548, 741 are available at Gutian 1st Road Station.

References

Wuhan Metro stations
Line 1, Wuhan Metro
Railway stations in China opened in 2010